John Williamson may refer to:

Music
 John Finley Williamson (1887–1964), American conductor
 John Williamson (singer) (born 1945), Australian singer and songwriter
 John Williamson (musician) (born 1963), bass guitarist in the band McCarthy
 John Williamson (album), the 1970 debut album by the Australian singer

Politics
 John Williamson (Arkansas politician), state legislator who served as President of the Arkansas Senate
 John Williamson (New Zealand politician) (1815–1875), New Zealand politician
 John H. Williamson (1846–1911), North Carolina politician and newspaper publisher
 John N. Williamson (1855–1943), U.S. Representative from Oregon
 John Williamson (communist) (1903–1974), Scottish-born American Communist leader
 John Williamson (Canadian politician) (born 1970), Canadian politician
 John C. Williamson (1912–1998), American politician, member of the California legislature
 John Clint Williamson (born 1961), U.S. Ambassador-at-Large for War Crimes Issues
 John Poage Williamson (1835–1917), American missionary, writer and member of the South Dakota House of Representatives

Sports
 John Williamson (footballer, born 1887) (1887–1943), English footballer for Sunderland
 John Williamson (footballer, born 1893) (1893–?), English footballer for Manchester United and Bury
 John Williamson (footballer, born 1981), English footballer for Burnley
 John Williamson (basketball, born 1951) (1951–1996), American pro basketball player, New York Nets
 John Williamson (basketball, born 1986), American basketball player in Israel
 Johnny Williamson (1929–2021), English footballer
 Jack Williamson (footballer) (1907–1965), Australian rules footballer
 John Gordon Williamson (1936–2023), English cricketer
 J. R. Williamson (1942–2020), linebacker for the Oakland Raiders and the New England Patriots

Other
 John Suther Williamson (–1836), British military officer
 John Williamson Nevin (1803–1886), American theologian
 John Bruce Williamson (1859–1938), British barrister and historian
 John Ernest Williamson (1881–1966), inventor of the "photosphere" for undersea photography
 John Williamson (mathematician) (1901–1949), Scottish mathematician
 John Williamson (geologist) (1907–1958), Canadian geologist
 Jack Williamson (1908–2006), American science fiction writer
 John Leon Williamson (1921–1942), Navy Cross recipient
 John Williamson (economist) (1937–2021), British professor
 John Williamson (musicologist) (born 1949), Scottish professor
 John Woolfenden Williamson (1869–1950), British writer about industrial networks
 John Williamson, known by the nickname Johnnie Notions, Shetland smallpox inoculator

See also
 Williamson (surname)
 Williamson (disambiguation)
 John Williams (disambiguation)